Pinus clausa is a species of pine endemic to the  Southeastern United States. Its common names include sand pine, Florida spruce pine, Alabama pine, and scrub pine.

Distribution
The tree is found in two separate locations, one across central peninsular Florida, and the other along the western Florida panhandle coast into the Alabama coast.

It is largely confined to very infertile, excessively well-drained, sandy habitats where competition from larger-growing species is minimized by the harsh growing conditions of hot sun, fast-draining white sands, and frequent severe seasonal droughts. It is often the only canopy tree in the Florida scrub ecosystem.

Description

Over much of its range, it is fire-adapted to stand-replacing wildfires, with the cones remaining closed for many years (clausa = closed), until a natural forest fire kills the mature trees and opens the cones. These then reseed the burnt ground. Some populations differ in having cones that open at maturity, with seed dispersal not relying on fires.

Uses
Pinus clausa woodlands are an important part of the Florida scrub ecosystem, and provide habitat for the endangered Florida sand skink, among other species. It is one of the few canopy trees able to grow in arid, sandy, and hot locations with minimal care.

While the dense branching makes this tree unsuitable for wood production, it is often used for wood pulp.

References

External links

Pinus clausa. USDA PLANTS.
Pinus clausa. Flora of North America.

clausa
Endemic flora of the United States
Flora of Florida
Trees of the Southeastern United States
Garden plants of North America
Ornamental trees
Plants used in bonsai